New Year's Eve 1995 - Live at Madison Square Garden is a live concert album by American rock band Phish that was released in 2005. The album comprises the band's December 31, 1995 show at Madison Square Garden, named by Rolling Stone as one of the "Greatest Concerts of the '90s".

Fans consider it one of Phish's best shows and the band considers it one of their top five concerts. Following this 1995 show, Phish established a tradition of performing multi-night New Year's shows at Madison Square Garden. The concert includes versions of two songs from The Who's Quadrophenia album, which Phish had covered in its entirety for their 1995 Halloween show, and songs from the band's Gamehendge song cycle.

The album was released on December 20, 2005, to celebrate the show's tenth anniversary and received the Archival Album of the Year award at the 6th Annual Jammy Awards in 2006. The release marked the first time that the song "The Sloth" had been issued on a commercially released Phish recording.

In addition to a CD, the album was released in FLAC and MP3 formats at LivePhish.com. Selected songs were also available in MPEG-4 video. On March 5, Phish announced that this would be released for Record Store Day 2015 as the band's first live vinyl box set.

Track listing

Disc one
Set one:
"Punch You in the Eye" (Anastasio) - 8:46
"The Sloth" (Anastasio) - 3:45
"Reba" (Anastasio) - 14:25
"The Squirming Coil" (Anastasio, Marshall) - 10:27
"Maze" (Anastasio, Marshall) - 10:18
"Colonel Forbin's Ascent" (Anastasio) - 5:22
"Fly Famous Mockingbird" (Anastasio) - 2:14
"Shine" (Roland) - 1:13
"Fly Famous Mockingbird" (Anastasio) - 7:19
"Sparkle" (Anastasio, Marshall) - 3:46
"Chalk Dust Torture" (Anastasio, Marshall) - 7:50

Disc Two
Set two:
"Audience Chess Move" - 1:32
"Drowned" (Townshend) - 12:27
"The Lizards" (Anastasio) - 10:37
"Axilla, Pt. 2" (Anastasio, Marshall) - 4:13
"Runaway Jim" (Abrahams, Anastasio) - 16:05
"Strange Design" (Anastasio, Marshall) - 3:36
"Hello My Baby" (Emerson, Howard, Singer) - 1:27
"Mike's Song" (Gordon) - 20:31

Disc Three
Set three:
"Gamehendge Time Phactory" (Anastasio, Fishman, Gordon, McConnell) - 5:03
"Auld Lang Syne" (Traditional) - 1:44
"Weekapaug Groove" (Anastasio, Fishman, Gordon, McConnell) - 17:42
"Sea and Sand" (Townshend) - 3:46
"You Enjoy Myself" (Anastasio) - 25:37
"Sanity" (Anastasio, Fishman, Gordon, McConnell, Pollak) - 6:08
"Frankenstein" (Winter) - 5:47
Encore:
"Johnny B. Goode" (Berry) - 4:59

Personnel
Phish
Trey Anastasio - guitars, percussion on "Runaway Jim", lead vocals, acapella vocals on "Hello My Baby"
Page McConnell - keyboards, backing vocals, lead vocals on "Strange Design" and "Sea and Sand", acapella vocals on "Hello My Baby"
Mike Gordon - bass guitar, backing vocals, lead vocals on "Drowned" and "Mike's Song", acapella vocals on "Hello My Baby"
Jon Fishman - drums, backing vocals, acapella vocals on "Hello My Baby"

Additional musicians
Tom Marshall - lead vocals on "Shine"

References

External links
Review at The Music Box - published January 2006, Vol. 13, #1

Jammy Award winners
LivePhish.com Downloads
Phish live albums
2005 live albums
Albums recorded at Madison Square Garden